Hajji Beyg (also Romanized as Ḩājjī Beyg and Ḩājī Beyg; also known as Hāji Bāgh, Ḩājjī Bāgh, and Ḩājjī Beyk) is a village in Malmir Rural District, Sarband District, Shazand County, Markazi Province, Iran. At the 2006 census, its population was 340, in 78 families.

References 

Populated places in Shazand County